Cedrela montana is a species of tree in the Meliaceae family. It is found in the Andes of Venezuela, Colombia, Ecuador and Peru between 1050 – 3600 meters of elevation.

Description
Trees up to 20 m (~60 ft) tall, trunk with fissured bark. Imparipinnate leaves 20–55 cm long, with ovate-elliptic or ovate-oblong (sometimes oblong) leaflets. Inflorescences between 12 and 30 cm long, with small greenish to cream colored flowers that grow in bunches.

Taxonomy
The Latin specific epithet montana refers to mountains or coming from mountains.

References

montana
Flora of the Andes
Trees of Colombia
Trees of Ecuador
Trees of Peru
Trees of Venezuela